Salomon de La Broue was a French  or riding-master and Gascon gentleman. His treatise on riding, published as the Preceptes Principaux in 1593, was the first to have been written in French. Like Antoine de Pluvinel, he was a pupil of Gianbattista Pignatelli.

De La Broue, like Pluvinel, was one of the founders of the old French haute école. His methods centred on calmness in hand, freedom and lightness in order to obtain the best results from the horse; he rejected the use of force or constraint in training.

Publications 

 Preceptes Principavx Qve les bons Caualerisses doiuent exactement obseruer en leurs Escole [1593]
 Le cavalerice françois: contenant les preceptes…, 1602 Full text of 1646 edition, vol 1; vol 2; vol 3

References

1530s births
1610s deaths
Dressage trainers
Classical horsemanship
Writers on horsemanship